Burnette Haskell (June 11, 1857 – November 16, 1907) was an American radical best known for co-founding the Kaweah Co-operative Commonwealth. He was also involved in anarchist and labor causes.

Life
Burnette Haskell was born in Sierra County, California, in 1857. He attended Oberlin College, the University of Illinois, and the University of California. Haskell was admitted to the State Bar of California in 1879 and worked with the California Republican State Committee before turning to labor organizing. He worked on The Truth, which was associated with the San Francisco Trade Assembly. Haskell frequently changed his political leanings, leading to his reputation in the labor movement as "brilliant but erratic".

Inspired by Laurence Gronlund's 1884 Co-operative Commonwealth, he organized the Cooperative land Purchase and Colonization Association of California with James Martin the next year. The group was closely connected with the anarchists, socialists, and unionists of the San Francisco International Workingmen's Association. Haskell and Martin led 53 colonists to found the Kaweah Co-operative Commonwealth in the Sierra forest (now Sequoia National Park) of Tulare County, California, in 1885. The group supported itself through timber harvesting and grew to 150 colonists. Socialist Gerald Geraldson and Gronlund supplied outside financial aid as well. The colony dissolved in January 1892 between a government land suit, colonist factionalism, and difficulties with Haskell's personality. Other sources claim that the Southern Pacific Railroad colluded with politicians to seize the colony's land. Eminent domain was used in 1890 to turn the colony's land into part of Sequoia National Park.

Haskell died in California in 1907.

Personal life
Haskell married Annie Fader, a socialist and suffragist, in 1882. Their son, Astaroth, known as Roth, was born in 1886. The couple split in 1897 but remained married through Haskell's 1907 death.

See also
Kaweah Colony

References

Bibliography

Further reading

 
 
 
 
 
 
 

1857 births
1907 deaths
American anarchists
Trade unionists from California
People from Sierra County, California
Oberlin College alumni
University of Illinois alumni
University of California alumni